Robbinsdale Cooper High School is a 4-year public high school in New Hope, Minnesota, a northwest suburb of Minneapolis, United States. Cooper, as it is informally known, became an IB World School in July 1998, and now offers the IB Middle Years Program (MYP) and the IB Diploma Programme along with a wide variety of courses and curricula suited to the needs of every student.  RCHS has a large fine arts and music program, as well as multiple extracurricular activities including a broad selection of athletics. RCHS is home to about 1600 students. Cooper students and alumni are known as Hawks, after the school's mascot.

School history

E. J. Cooper Senior High School, as it was originally known, was built in 1964 to accommodate increasing enrollment in the Robbinsdale Area School District (Independent School District 281).  Once called the most modern high school in the area, Cooper was advanced in both structure and audiovisual technology.  It was named for district superintendent Edwin J. ("E.J.") Cooper, and for years E.J. was a popular guest at school gatherings. The school's first principal was Lyndon Ulrich. In its first year, Cooper held classes for kindergarten as well as grades 10 through 12. It then held grades 10 through 12 for many years before adding the 9th grade in the 1990s.

In 1982, declining enrollment in the district forced the closure of one of the district's 3 high schools.  Robbinsdale High School was chosen for closure after contentious debate.  In an effort to placate Robbinsdale residents, the two remaining high schools within the district, Cooper and Armstrong, were renamed Robbinsdale Cooper and Robbinsdale Armstrong.

Cooper Athletics & Activities

Cooper entered into the MSHSL Metro West Conference in the fall of 2014. From 2005 to 2014, Cooper teams competed in the now-defunct North Suburban Conference.

The Girls' Swim Team won the North Suburban Conference Championship in 2005 and 2006. The Boys' Basketball Team won the Conference Championship in 2006, and finished 2nd in the state tournament behind Hopkins High School. This was the first time since 1975 that the team had made it to the state tournament.  In 2010 Cooper Sophomore Brenna Walek set 4 Minnesota State High School League records for softball including home runs in a single game (4), consecutive home runs (4), RBIs in a game (9), and walks in a single game (4).

In the 2010–2011 Boys' Hockey season, the Hawks beat their archrival the Armstrong Falcons. It was the first win against Armstrong since 1995. This 2010-11 team tallied 14 wins, their most since 1984. The Girls' hockey team was also quite successful in 2010–11, racking up 7 wins which tied their all-time high. However that season would be their last as the girls' team merged with the Armstrong Falcons in the fall of 2011. The boys' hockey team merged with the Armstrong boys' team in the fall of 2014.

Traditionally, the Cooper Hawks' primary athletic rivalry has been with the Armstrong Falcons.

In 2017-18 the Girls’ Basketball team won the Metro West Conference for the second consecutive season with a 14–0 record in conference play.  They would go on to win their Section and advance to the State Tournament for the first time in program history.  The Hawks would be the #1 seed in the Class AAA State tournament and win their Quarterfinal game against Alexandria High School 58–51, the next day they advanced to the State Championship game with a win over Willmar High School 65–54.  In the State Title game they would win against Northfield High School 49-37 for the first Girls’ Basketball Championship in School History.  The Hawks finished with a record of 29–2 in the 2017–18 season.

Notable alumni
Brother Ali, artist/rapper signed to Rhymesayers Entertainment
Douglas McCain, jihadist killed in Syria
Dan Johnson, NFL player
Jim Johnson, NHL player
Troy Kastigar, jihadist killed in Somalia
Paul Kohls, member of Minnesota House of Representatives 2003-11
Lance Pitlick, NHL player
Steve Plasencia, distance runner, 1988 and 1992 Summer Olympics
The Scary Guy, anti-bullying advocate
Rashad Vaughn, NBA player
David Webber, class of 1987, managed in TNA wrestling as Mortimer Plumtree
Rodney Williams Jr., professional basketball player
Steve Zahn, actor

References

External links

Public high schools in Minnesota
International Baccalaureate schools in Minnesota
Educational institutions established in 1964
Schools in Hennepin County, Minnesota
1964 establishments in Minnesota